

Tour matches

List A: Sri Lanka Board XI vs Australia XI

ODI series

1st ODI

Test series
Sri Lanka won the three-match Test series 1-0 with 2 draws. Their win in the first match was their first victory against Australia in Tests.

1st Test

2nd Test

3rd Test

External links
Series home at ESPN Crickinfo

References

1999 in Australian cricket
1999 in Sri Lankan cricket
1999
Sri Lankan cricket seasons from 1972–73 to 1999–2000
International cricket competitions from 1997–98 to 2000